The friendly fantail (Rhipidura albolimbata) is a species of bird in the family Rhipiduridae.
It is found in the highlands of New Guinea.
Its natural habitat is subtropical or tropical moist montane forests.

References

friendly fantail
Birds of New Guinea
friendly fantail
Taxonomy articles created by Polbot